Eugene Luke Gill (August 8, 1898 – October 11, 1981) was an American football, basketball, baseball coach and college athletics administrator. He served as the head football coach at the University of Hawaii from 1940 to 1941. In 1941, Gill and Tom Kaulukukui were co-head coaches. Gill was born on August 8, 1898, in Eugene, Oregon, and raised in the Salem, Oregon area.  He attended Oregon Agricultural College–now known as Oregon State University—where he lettered in football and ran track.  He was the brother of Slats Gill, who was head basketball coach, head baseball coach, and athletic director at Oregon State.  Gill died on October 11, 1981, at Veterans Administration Medical Center in Roseburg, Oregon.

Head coaching record

Football

References

External links
 

1898 births
1981 deaths
Basketball coaches from Oregon
Hawaii Rainbow Warriors and Rainbow Wahine athletic directors
Hawaii Rainbow Warriors baseball coaches
Hawaii Rainbow Warriors basketball coaches
Hawaii Rainbow Warriors football coaches
Oregon State Beavers football players
Oregon State Beavers men's track and field athletes
Sportspeople from Eugene, Oregon
Sportspeople from Salem, Oregon
Track and field athletes from Oregon
Players of American football from Oregon